Thubana felinaurita is a species of moth of the family Lecithoceridae. It is found in Guangxi in China.

The wingspan is 20.5–21 mm. The head of the adult is grayish brown, with grayish white scales around the eyes. The antennae are yellowish white and longer than the forewing. The forewings are rectangular, with the costa gently curved and the apex blunt. They have a brown with dark purple color and a grayish black fringe with a yellowish white basal line. The hindwings are grayish brown and the fringe is fawn black, with a yellowish white basal line.

Etymology
The specific name is derived from the Latin felinus (= feline) and auritus (= auricular), referring to the shape of the posterolateral lobes of the juxta.

External links
Review of the genus Thubana Walker (Lepidoptera, Lecithoceridae) from China, with description of one new species

Moths described in 2010
Thubana